Echallens railway station is a railway station in the municipality of Échallens, in the Swiss canton of Vaud. The depot for the LEB is located at the station and approximately half all trains from Lausanne-Flon terminate here.

Services 
 the following services stop at Echallens:

References

External links 
 
 

Railway stations in the canton of Vaud
Lausanne–Echallens–Bercher Railway stations